The 2012 AFC Challenge Cup Final was an association football match between Turkmenistan and North Korea on 19 March 2012 at the Dasarath Rangasala Stadium in Kathmandu, Nepal.

Background
The AFC Challenge Cup was an international football competition for Asian Football Confederation (AFC) nations that was categorized as "emerging countries" in the "Vision Asia" program. It was an idea by former AFC president Mohammed Bin Hammam and its goal was to raise the standards of Asian football at all levels. The AFC Challenge Cup, which reflected the philosophy of "Vision Asia", was created for teams to experience playing in a continental competition with the possibility to win an AFC trophy and potentially discover new talent. It was held in every two years as its inaugural edition took place on 2006 in Bangladesh. The winner qualifies for the 2015 AFC Asian Cup.

Route to the final

Match

References

Final
AFC Challenge Cup Finals
North Korea national football team matches
Turkmenistan national football team matches
2012 in North Korean football
2012 in Turkmenistani football
March 2012 sports events in Asia